The seventh season of King of the Hill originally aired Sundays on the Fox Broadcasting Company at 8:30–9:00 p.m. (EST), 7:30–8:30 p.m. (EST) and 7:00–7:30 p.m. (EST) from November 3, 2002, to May 18, 2003. The Region 1 DVD was released on November 18, 2014.

Production
This was the first season that John Altschuler and Dave Krinsky were showrunners, and they would remain in this position for the remainder of King of the Hill'''s original run. The wackier stories from recent years began to be phased out. Series creator Mike Judge described the episodes from this season as "small personal stories like we did in the second season." In a 2007 interview with Animation World Network, Altschuler reflected that, "Mike was unhappy with the drift of the show around seasons four and five. Peggy just became crazy, Bobby just became gay, Hank started getting weaker and weaker until he was literally being ordered around by Dale."  Altschuler added, "If you don't police characters on a daily basis, you go for jokes. 'Oh, it's funny that Peggy is mean to her family at this point.' 'Oh, okay, we're tired, let's do it again.' If you do it again and again, what happened was people started hating Peggy's character and felt distant from her. The show just kind of lost its way. What we've done since seasons six and seven was just work on getting the characters back to where they started and keeping them there."

The episodes "Goodbye Normal Jeans" and "Pigmalion" were both produced and copyrighted in 2001. "Goodbye Normal Jeans", a Thanksgiving episode, is the first episode from the 6ABE (Season 6) production line, and was originally supposed to air on November 18, 2001. However, Fox's NFL coverage ran late that night, so the episode was pre-empted, and since it was a Thanksgiving-themed episode and that was the last Sunday before Thanksgiving, the episode was held back until November 2002. "Pigmalion" takes place during Halloween, and came from the 5ABE (Season 5) production line. It was initially announced as a holdover for Season 6, that would possibly air around Halloween 2001, although the episode was delayed for unspecified reasons (this may have been due to its disturbing content). "Pigmalion" was eventually shown as an "extra" episode for Season 7 in January 2003. When it aired, "Pigmalion" was absent from the episode listing on Fox's official King of the Hill'' website.

This was also the first season which did not include a Christmas episode, other than Season 1 which did not air any episodes during December.

Episodes

References

2002 American television seasons
2003 American television seasons
King of the Hill 07